Par17, a member of the parvulin family of peptidyl-prolyl-cis/trans-isomerases (PPIases), is an isoform of parvulin 14 (Par14) and originates from alternative transcription initiation of the PIN4 gene on chromosome Xq13 in humans. Par17, which carries a 25 residue N-terminal extension, shares the complete successive amino acid sequence with Par14. In contrast to Par14, Par17 is exclusively expressed in Hominidae, as ORFs were only found within the genomes of orangutans, gorillas, chimpanzees and humans. The N-terminal extension seems to be responsible for the translocation of Par17 to the mitochondrial matrix. Par17 is involved in tubulin and actin polymerization as well as in hepatitis B virus replication. Using photoaffinity labeling and liquid chromatography–mass spectrometry analysis, Par17 was found to be associated with mitochondrial proteins such as members of the electron transport chain in human cells.

References

EC 5.2.1